Bugatti Chiron may refer to two cars named after Monegasque driver Louis Chiron:
Bugatti Chiron. successor to Bugatti Veyron
Bugatti 18/3 Chiron, 1999 concept car